The Kursk State University Library is a library in Kursk State University (KGU). The library was founded in 1934 simultaneously with the opening of Kursk State Pedagogical Institute.

Overview

The Kursk State University Library was founded July 22, 1934. Today more than 60 people work in the library. The Kursk State University Library is a research information center for the libraries of state universities of Kursk and Kursk Oblast. The structure of the Kursk State University Library  includes a circulating library, reading and electronic reading rooms, a point of issue of art-graphic faculty. Every year the library serves more than 40 000 members — students, teachers, university employees. It was issued more than 1.3 million copies.

Collection

The library сollection has more than 700 000 units. It presents the scientific, academic and fiction publications, normative documents, theses and author's abstract of theses, electronic publications in various formats, etc. More than 10 000 copies of new publications and 400 titles of periodicals receive to the сollection each year.

Information technology
The library uses the automated library-information system "Ruslan", which contains the online public access catalog of library collections, full-text electronic versions of the publications of the scientists of the University, full-text publications of the antique сollection (rare books and limited editions) of the academic library. The users of the library have access to the various legal reference systems and the various remote information resources.

References

Further reading

External links
 Kursk State University Library website 

Academic libraries
Libraries in Russia
1934 establishments in the Soviet Union
Buildings and structures in Kursk